Gemma Hunt (born 1 April 1982) is a British presenter who also used to be on the CBBC TV series Xchange.

CBBC
Hunt joined the CBBC continuity team in 2002, since then she has presented on the CBBC Channel and also on BBC One and BBC Two. In 2004, she was noticed by CBBC series Xchange and later became a presenter until its close in 2006. She continued to present CBBC until its revamp in 2007. As well as her presenting duties she has made guest appearances on Blue Peter and Smile. More recently she guest presented the food special of Best of Friends alongside Ortis Deley. She has filmed a series with Barney Harwood for CBBC called Barney's Barrier Reef, which began airing on Monday 12 January 2009 at 7:30 on BBC Two. The show returned for a second series, now entitled Barney's Latin America. She also made a guest appearance live on the CBBC Channel in Office on 5 August 2010 and was the main presenter on Swashbuckle.

Education
Hunt attended Staverton Primary School in Staverton, Wiltshire, which was then followed by her secondary school education at The John of Gaunt School, Trowbridge, Wiltshire. She graduated with a Bachelor of Arts (Honours) in Media Performance from the University of Bedfordshire in 2003.

Television

Other appearances
In 2007, Hunt appeared in an episode of Chucklevision entitled "Muscling In". She was the compere of a strong man contest, which pitted Barry Chuckle against the cheating man mountain Magnus Sorenson (played by Joe Montana).

She has also appeared in pantomimes. In 2007/2008 she played the lead role in Cinderella at the Palace Theatre, Mansfield. In 2008/2009, Hunt played Tinkerbell, alongside fellow CBBC presenter Barney Harwood in Peter Pan at the Pavilion Theatre in Bournemouth. In 2012/2013 she performed at the Churchill Theatre, Bromley in Peter Pan alongside Jennifer Ellison.

In August 2009, she and Harwood presented a BBC Proms concert at the Royal Albert Hall in London entitled "Evolution!", during which they interviewed Sir David Attenborough. In 2010, she guest starred in the CBBC sitcom Hotel Trubble as a television presenter in the episode "Catz N Doggz".

She is one of two lead presenters of the Alpha course film series, alongside Toby Flint, in which she describes her Christian faith.

References

External links
Beds.ac.uk
Beds.ac.uk
Walkoffame.co.uk
Archive.wiltshire.co.uk
Archive.wiltshire.co.uk
Archive.swindonadvertiser.co.uk

1982 births
Living people
Alumni of the University of Bedfordshire
Black British television personalities
British television presenters
English people of Antigua and Barbuda descent
People from Wiltshire
English Christians